Cursed Legacy was the name of Cask J. Thomson's  music project.  project that was formed in 2008.

Death of a Hero (2008) and The Encounter I: Bound for Nonexistence (2012)
Their debut album Death of a Hero was released in December 2008 through Festival Mushroom Records in Australia and independently worldwide. The album spawned two tracks "Maybe One Day" which received airplay in Australia and Mexico which was followed by "Mistress" which featured on Australia's FBI and Triple J radio stations. The album's quality has been compared to that of earlier releases in history due to its completely analog recording and mastering process. There are subtle but audible glitches throughout the album as a result.

The second release The Encounter I: Bound for Nonexistence was released worldwide on 21 December 2012 and departed from the project's soft sound, incorporating screamo vocals for the first time and featuring a full band. Despite having performed as an acoustic group in the past with various session musicians, the band ceased live performances starting from 2012. The Encounter deals with the psychological trauma of alien abduction.  The album's lyrical content was examined by panel guests at MUFON Conference of whom the concept was inspired by. The album was briefly featured and showcased on Microsoft's Xbox Live Music store in December 2012.

Tortured by Remorse (2014) and Lunar Isolation Musical Album (2017)
Cursed Legacy released the exclusive digital album "Discard Once Motionless" through Bandcamp on a pay-what-you-want basis. It was featured on the homepage on the day of release as the first part of a two-part set with the second titled "Embrace when Moving" however the second half was scrapped and the record was not released in physical form.

In early 2014, the project announced a new narrative-based album that would loosely tie in with the concept of their debut. "Tortured by Remorse" was released. It was described as a "Mix between Genesis and Yes" by Classic Rock Magazine Australia. The album's largely piano based sound was well received by critics.
Later that year the band signed a contract with an independent publisher to release a compilation of newly mixed and edited tracks from prior releases. "This is Cursed Legacy" contains digitally remastered versions of songs from the analog Death of a Hero.

In 2015, it was revealed that a rock musical was in the works. The composition of "Lunar Isolation" would be done by a film composer and will contain various guest artists and the projects first voice cast and narrator. Lord Tim of metal bands Lord and  Dungeon was revealed as a guitarist for the musical. The album was to be funded using crowdfunding site Kickstarter but was removed several days after launching for unmentioned reasons.
According to the band's press release the album is about a man who is falsely imprisoned and sentenced to work on the moon as a miner. The album was set for a tentative 2017 release date. A promotional video featuring a sample of the album was released in August 2015 stating that the record will 'define a new chapter in Cursed Legacy' switching the band's signature sound of melancholy folk rock. Several special guests are expected to appear on the album.

In January 2016, Cursed Legacy announced via their Facebook page that the first single from the album titled "Time to Go" would premiere on 1 February. with the 2008-2014 releases to be considered "the first era" of the band It has also been suggested that a stage show based on the album is in the works.
On 10 February an EP featuring several mixes of the track "Time to Go" was released. The artist and label revealed in March that all previous releases would be deleted and removed from sale

Musical style
Cursed Legacy's musical style ranges from folk, doom metal and ambient. The debut release Death of a Hero was singer/songwriter focused as opposed to The Encounter which contained metalcore growls and heavy instrumentation. The band's music often ties in with narrative-based storylines.

Discography
Studio albums
 Death of a Hero (2008)
 The Encounter I: Bound for Nonexistence (2012)
 Tortured by Remorse (2014)

Extended Plays
 Discard Once Motionless (Digital Only Release) (B-Sides and Unreleased Studio Tracks) (2013)
 The Time to Go EP (2016)

Compilations
 This is Cursed Legacy / This is Cursed Legacy Unplugged (Remixed and Remastered) (2014)

References

Musical groups established in 2003
New South Wales musical groups
Australian heavy metal musical groups
Australian power metal musical groups